Summus Senator is a medieval title of Rome for the head of the civil government in the city.

The ancient Senate continued to function after the fall of the Western Roman Empire, but it became increasingly irrelevant and seems to have disappeared in the seventh century. It is last attested in 603, when it acclaimed new statues of Emperor Phocas and Empress Leontia in 603, and in 630 the Senate House was transformed into a church by Pope Honorius I.

The title senator did continue to be used in the Early Middle Ages (it was held by Crescentius the Younger (d.998) and in its feminine form senatrix by Marozia (d.937), to give two prominent examples) but it appears to have been regarded as a vague title of nobility and no longer indicated membership of an organized governing body.

In 1144, the Commune of Rome attempted to establish a government modeled on the old Roman Republic in opposition to the temporal power of the higher nobles (in particular the Frangipani family) and the pope. This included setting up a senate along the lines of the ancient one.

Most of our sources state that there were 56 senators in this revived senate, and modern historians have therefore interpreted this to indicate that there were four senators for each of the fourteen regiones of Rome. These senators, the first real senators since the 7th century, elected as their leader Giordano Pierleoni, son of the Roman consul Pier Leoni, with the title patrician, since the term consul had been deprecated as a noble styling.

This new form of civil government was constantly under pressure from the papacy and the Holy Roman Emperor. From 1192 onwards the popes succeeded in reducing the 56-strong senate down to a single individual, styled Summus Senator, who subsequently became the head of the civil government of Rome under the pope's aegis.

In the post-Commune period, the title senator again became a purely honorific one. For example, Pope Clement IV bestowed it on Henry of Castile in 1267 to reward him for his support of Charles I of Naples.

References

Sources
 
 
 

Commune of Rome
12th century in the Papal States